Lowbrow may refer to:
 Lowbrow, relating to, or suitable for a person with little taste or intellectual interest, the converse of highbrow
 Lowbrow, forms of entertainment that are unsophisticated, i.e. not difficult or requiring much intelligence to be understood
 Lowbrow (art movement), describes an underground visual art movement that arose in the Los Angeles, California, area in the late 1970s
 Low culture, a derogatory term for some forms of popular culture
 Lowbrow, the original title of the pilot of the Cartoon Network series Megas XLR
 Danger: Low Brow, a radio comedy show from Melbourne aired from 1985 to 1991
 Low comedy, a form of unsophisticated entertainment

See also
Highbrow, synonymous with intellectual
Middlebrow, describes both a certain type of easily accessible art, often literature, as well as the population that uses art to acquire culture and class that is usually unattainable